Jappe Claes (born 22 October 1952) is a Belgian actor; he mainly works in the Netherlands and appeared in more than forty films since 1983. In 2014 he left the Theaterschool after accusations of sexual abuse.

Selected filmography

Film

Television

References

External links
 

1952 births
Living people
People from Tienen
Flemish male film actors
20th-century Belgian male actors
21st-century Belgian male actors